Knoch High School is located in the Knoch School District in Saxonburg, Pennsylvania.  The school mascot is a knight, referring to them as; the "Knoch Knights".  The Knoch Football team was a co-champion of the Greater Allegheny Conference in 2007, and in 2011, the Knights were the Greater Allegheny Conference Champion with a perfect regular season record of 9–0. They played in the WPIAL championship at Heinz Field, but lost to Montour High School, ending with a season record of 12–1.   The principal is Mr. Todd Trofimuk.  The athletics play in AAA under the Pennsylvania Interscholastic Athletic Association.  There are usually between 1,000 and 1,200 students in the high school, from 9th through 12th graders.  The Knoch colors are blue and gold.  Sports offered include Girls Volleyball, Football, Cross Country, Girls and Boys Soccer, Girls and Boys Tennis, Girls and Boys Basketball, Girls and Boys Swimming and Diving, Wrestling, Hockey, Baseball, Softball, Girls and Boys Track, and Boys and Girls Lacrosse.  Their primary sports rivals are Mars, Pine Richland, and Highlands High Schools.  Knoch Junior High School opened in 1958 and at that time had students from 7th through 12th Grade.  In 1996 it was remodeled, and Knoch Middle School was created.  This made Knoch High School have just 9th through 12th grade.  The school is named Knoch because Eva Knoch donated the land for the school to be built on.

Notable alumni
Joby Harris, NASA artist
Michele McDonald, Miss USA 1971
A. J. Pagano, former college football player
Michele Pawk, Tony Award-winning actress
Jim Simons, former professional golfer
 Robert Smolen, former U.S. Air Force commanding general
Scot Thompson, former professional baseball player, Chicago Cubs, Montreal Expos, and San Francisco Giants
Jordan Geist, professional track and field athlete.

References

Public high schools in Pennsylvania
Educational institutions established in 1958
Schools in Butler County, Pennsylvania
1958 establishments in Pennsylvania